Oktay Güngör is a Turkish freestyle wrestler competing in the 125 kg division. He is a member of Istanbul BB SK.

Career 

In 2018, he won bronze medal in the men's 125 kg event at the 2018 European Juniors Wrestling Championships held in Rome, Italy.

References

External links 
 

Living people
Turkish male sport wrestlers
1998 births